Paul Harrison was an American football and baseball coach. He served as the head football coach at Northern Illinois University from 1920 to 1922, compiling a record of 11–14–1.  Harrison was also the head baseball coach at Northern Illinois from 1921 to 1923, tallying a mark of 11–13–1.

Head coaching record

Football

References

Year of birth missing
Year of death missing
American football fullbacks
American football tackles
Northern Illinois Huskies baseball coaches
Northern Illinois Huskies football coaches
Northern Illinois Huskies football players